Arthur A. Leeper (August 21, 1855 – December 22, 1931) was an American lawyer and politician.

Leeper was born near Chandlerville, Cass County, Illinois. He went to the public schools. Lepper went to Eureka College and to University of Iowa College of Law. He lived in Virginia, Illinois with his wife and family. Leeper served as state's attorney for Cass County. He served in the Illinois Senate from 1889 to 1901 and was a Democrat. He died at his daughter's home in Clinton, Illinois.

Notes

1855 births
1931 deaths
People from Virginia, Illinois
Eureka College alumni
University of Iowa College of Law alumni
Illinois lawyers
District attorneys in Illinois
Democratic Party Illinois state senators